A Kyin Nar Myit Phyar is a 2019 Burmese drama television series. It aired on MRTV-4, from October 23 to November 19, 2019, on Mondays to Fridays at 20:45 for 20 episodes.

Cast
 Moe Yan Zun as Thurain
 Khin Wint Wah as Chaw Su
 Htoo Aung as Deputy Sheriff Arkar
 Wai Lyan as Aung Aung
 Htet Htet Htun as Cherry
 May Kabyar Oo as Su Hlaing

References

Burmese television series
MRTV (TV network) original programming